The 2009–10 Charlotte 49ers men's basketball team represented the University of North Carolina at Charlotte in the 2009–10 college basketball season. This was head coach Bobby Lutz's twelfth season at Charlotte. The 49ers compete in the Atlantic 10 Conference and played their home games at Dale F. Halton Arena. They finished the season 19–12, 9–7 in A-10 play and lost in the first round of the 2010 Atlantic 10 men's basketball tournament. They were not invited to a post season tournament.

Roster
Source

Schedule and results

|-
!colspan=9 style=| Regular Season

|-
!colspan=9 style=| Atlantic 10 tournament

References

Charlotte
Charlotte 49ers men's basketball seasons
Charlotte 49ers men's basket
Charlotte 49ers men's basket